Switchel, switzel, swizzle, switchy, ginger-water or haymaker's punch is a drink made of water mixed with vinegar, and often seasoned with ginger. It is usually sweetened with molasses, though honey, sugar, brown sugar, or maple syrup are sometimes used instead. In the U.S. state of Vermont, oatmeal and lemon juice were sometimes added to the beverage.

Switchel debatably originated in the Caribbean, but New England also holds credit as the source of switchel, and it became a popular summer drink in the American Colonies in the late 17th century. By the 19th century, it had become a traditional drink to serve to thirsty farmers at hay harvest time, hence the nickname haymaker's punch. Herman Melville wrote in I and My Chimney, "I will give a traveler a cup of switchel, if he want it; but am I bound to supply him with a sweet taste?" In The Long Winter Laura Ingalls Wilder describes a switchel-like beverage that her mother had sent for Laura and her father to drink while haying: "Ma had sent them ginger-water. She had sweetened the cool well-water with sugar, flavored it with vinegar, and put in plenty of ginger to warm their stomachs so they could drink till they were not thirsty. Ginger-water would not make them sick, as plain cold water would when they were so hot."

The Vermont physician D. C. Jarvis recommended a similar drink (a mixture of honey and cider vinegar), which he called "honegar".

Switchel is experiencing a renewed interest and has become a steadily-growing category in the ready-to-drink beverage industry. As of 2015, there are several companies that produce and distribute switchel beverages throughout the US. Canada has two commercial switchel producers.

It has also been used in recent years as a base in alcoholic cocktails, or as a mixer.

See also 
 Ginger ale
 Posca
 Shrub (drink)
 Sekanjabin

References

External links 
 How To Make Traditional Switchel (Haymaker's Punch)

American drinks
Caribbean drinks
Non-alcoholic drinks
Vermont cuisine
Vinegar